"More" is a popular song with music by Alex Alstone and lyrics by Tom Glazer, published in 1956.  The best-known version of the song was recorded by Perry Como on May 8, 1956, alongside, Mitchell Ayres and His Orchestra and The Ray Charles Singers.

It was issued as a single (RCA Victor catalog number 20-6554 on 78rpm, 47-6554 on 45rpm in the U.S., HMV POP-240 in the UK. It was also issued on an EP, With a Song In My Heart.

Chart performance
"More" reached No. 4 on the U.S. charts and No. 10 on the UK Singles Chart. The flip side of both releases was "Glendora".

Cover versions
A recording of the song was also made in the United Kingdom by Jimmy Young. It was issued by UK Decca Records as catalog number F 10774 and reached No. 4 on the UK Singles Chart in 1956.

References

1956 singles
Perry Como songs
1956 songs
Songs with lyrics by Tom Glazer